The Phlegraean Fields (from Ancient Greek  'to burn') is a large region of supervolcanic calderas situated to the west of Naples, Italy. It was declared a regional park in 2003. The area of the caldera consists of 24 craters and volcanic edifices; most of them lie under water. Hydrothermal activity can be observed at Lucrino, Agnano and the town of Pozzuoli. There are also effusive gaseous manifestations in the Solfatara crater, the mythological home of the Roman god of fire, Vulcan. 
This area is monitored by the Vesuvius Observatory. It is considered a supervolcano.

The area also features bradyseismic phenomena, which are most evident at the Macellum of Pozzuoli (misidentified as a temple of Serapis): bands of boreholes left by marine molluscs on marble columns show that the level of the site in relation to sea level has varied.

Geological phases 
Three geological phases or periods are recognised and distinguished.
 The First Phlegraean Period. Its Volcanic Explosivity Index (VEI) was 7. These included the Middle to Upper Paleolithic cultural transition and the replacement of Neanderthal populations by anatomically modern Homo sapiens, a subject of sustained debate. No less than 150 km3 of magma were extruded in this eruption (the CI eruption), traces of which can be detected in Greenland ice cores. As widespread discontinuities in archaeological sequences are observed at or after this eruption, a significant interference with ongoing human processes in Mediterranean Europe is hypothesized." It is possible that these eruptions drove Neanderthals to extinction and cleared the way for modern humans to thrive in Europe and Asia. The area is characterised by banks of piperno and pipernoid grey tuff at Camaldoli hill, as in the northern and western ridge of Mount Cumae; other referable deep products are those found at Monte di Procida, recognizable in the cliffs of its coast.

 The Second Phlegraean Period, between 35,000–10,500 years ago. Approximately 12,000 years ago the last major eruption occurred, forming a smaller caldera inside the main caldera, with its centre where the town of Pozzuoli lies today.
 The Third Phlegraean Period, between 8,000 – 500 years ago. This is characterized by white pozzolana, the material that forms the majority of volcanos in the Fields. Broadly speaking, it can be said there was initial activity to the southwest in the zone of Bacoli and Baiae (10,000–8,000 years ago); intermediate activity in an area centred between Pozzuoli, Spaccata Mountain and Agnano (8,000–3,900 years ago); and more recent activity towards the west, which formed Lake Avernus and Monte Nuovo (New Mountain) (3,800–500 years ago).
 Volcanic deposits indicative of eruption have been dated by argon at  315,000, 205,000, 157,000 and 18,000  years ago.

More recent history 

The caldera, which now is essentially at ground level, is accessible on foot. It contains many fumaroles, from which steam can be seen issuing, and over 150 pools (at the last count) of boiling mud. Several subsidiary cones and tuff craters lie within the caldera. One of these craters is filled by Lake Avernus.

In 1538, an eight-day eruption in the area deposited enough material to create a new hill, Monte Nuovo.

The volcanic island of Ischia suffered three destructive earthquakes in 1828, 1881 and 1883, the most destructive occurring in 1883. It had a magnitude of 4.2–5.2, but caused catastrophic shaking assigned XI (Extreme) on the MCS scale. Extreme damage was reported on the island and over 2,000 residents perished.

At present, the Phlegraean Fields area comprises the Naples districts of Agnano and Fuorigrotta, the area of Pozzuoli, Bacoli, Monte di Procida, Quarto, the Phlegraean Islands (Ischia, Procida and Vivara). 

A 2009 journal article stated that inflation of the caldera centre near Pozzuoli might presage an eruptive event within decades. Local scientists are worried that such drilling could itself initiate an eruption or earthquake. In 2010 the Naples city council halted the drilling project. Programme scientists said the drilling was no different from industrial drilling in the area. The newly elected mayor allowed the project to go forward. A Reuters article emphasized that the area could produce a "super volcano" that might kill millions.

It adds that from 1985 to 2011 the dynamics of ground uplift were mostly linked to the caldera's hydrothermal system, and that this relation broke down in 2012.

In December 2016, activity became so high that an eruption was feared. In May 2017 a new study by University College London and the Vesuvius Observatory published in Nature Communications revealed that an eruption might be closer than previously thought. The study found that the geographical unrest since the 1950s has a cumulative effect, causing a build-up of energy in the crust and making the volcano more susceptible to eruption.

On 21 August 2017 there was a magnitude 4 earthquake on the western edge of the Campi Flegrei area. Two people were killed and many more people injured in Casamicciola on the northern coast of the island of Ischia, which is south of the epicentre.

A February 2020 status report indicated that inflation around Pozzuoli continues at steady rates with a maximum average of 0.7 cm per month since July 2017. Gas emissions and fumarole temperatures did not change significantly.

On Sunday April 26, 2020, a moderate earthquake swarm hit Campi Flegrei caldera, which included about 34 earthquakes ranging between magnitude 0 and magnitude 3.1 with the swarm centered around the port city of  Pozzuoli. The strongest quake in the Earthquake sequence was a magnitude 3.1, which is the strongest earthquake in the caldera going back to the last major period of unrest and rapid uplift in 1982-1984. However, no new fumaroles were reported.

In its weekly bulletin of April 6 2021, the Italian National Institute of Geophysics and Volcanology (INGV) reported that the Rione Terra (RITE) GPS tiltmeter had an average uplift rate of 13mm per month +/- 2mm. The strongest quake since March 29 2021 had been of magnitude 2.2, and the RITE GPS station had measured 72.5cm of uplift since January 2011.

Future hazards 
While Campi Flegrei has seen more unrest lately, an eruption in the area is unlikely to happen in the near future. 
Though a large-scale eruption like the one that occurred 39,000 years ago is very unlikely, a new caldera-forming eruption in the area is a possibility. Considering the unrest seen at the port of Pozzuoli, it is probable that the next eruption will take place within that region of the caldera.

Geoheritage designation
In respect of its 18th and 19th century role in the development of geoscience, not least volcanology, this locality was included by the International Union of Geological Sciences (IUGS) in its assemblage of 100 'geological heritage sites' around the world in a listing published in October 2022.

Wine
Italian wine, both red and white, under the Campi Flegrei DOC appellation comes from this area. Grapes destined for DOC production must be harvested up to a maximum yield of 12 tonnes/hectare for red grape varieties, and 13 tonnes/ha for white grape varieties. The finished wines need to be fermented to a minimum alcohol level of 11.5% for reds and 10.5% for whites. While most Campi Flegrei wines are blends, varietal wines can be made from individual varieties, provided the variety used comprises at least 90% of the blend and the wine is fermented to at least 12% alcohol for reds and 11% for whites.

Red Campi Flegrei is a blend of 50–70% Piedirosso, 10–30% Aglianico and/or Sciascinoso and up to 10% of other local (both red and white) grape varieties. The whites are composed of 50–70% Falanghina, 10–30% Biancolella and/or Coda di Volpe, with up to 30% of other local white grape varieties.

Cultural importance
Campi Flegrei has had strategic and cultural importance.
The area was known to the ancient Greeks, who had a colony nearby at Cumae, the seat of the Cumaean Sibyl.
The beach of Miliscola, in Bacoli, was the Roman military academy headquarters.
Lake Avernus was believed to be the entrance to the underworld, and is portrayed as such in the Aeneid of Virgil. During the civil war between Octavian and Antony, Agrippa tried to turn the lake into a military port, the Portus Julius.
Baiae, now lying underwater, was a fashionable coastal resort and was the site of summer villas of Julius Caesar, Nero, and Hadrian (who died there).
In Pozzuoli is the Flavian Amphitheatre, the third-largest Italian amphitheatre after the Colosseum and the Capuan Amphitheatre.
The Via Appia passed through the comune of Quarto, entirely built on an extinguished crater.
The Cave of Dogs, a famous tourist attraction during the early modern period, is on the eastern side of the Fields.
Europe's youngest mountain, Monte Nuovo, is here. A WWF oasis lies beside the enormous Astroni crater.
The tombs of Agrippina the Elder and Scipio Africanus are here.
It included the largest ancient dome in the world before the construction of the Roman Pantheon.
Astronomical broadcaster and writer Patrick Moore used to cite these Fields as an example of why the impact craters on the Moon must be of volcanic origin, which was thought to be the case until the 1960s.
There is a theory that the Campanian Ignimbrite super-eruption around about 39,280 ± 110 years ago contributed to the demise of Neanderthal Man, based on evidence from Mezmaiskaya cave in the Caucasus Mountains of southern Russia.

See also
 List of volcanoes in Italy
 Phlegra (mythology)

References

Further reading

External links

Phlegraean Fields tour (i Campi Flegrei)
Phlegraean Fields
Volcanological Excursion to Campi Flegrei
Historical and Geological Introduction to the Neapolitan area
Campi Flegrei Volcano’s Ancient Cycle Seems to End in Large Eruption

Calderas of Italy
Campanian volcanic arc
Landforms of Campania
Geography of Naples
Geography of the Metropolitan City of Naples
Parks in Campania
Volcanic crater lakes
Submarine calderas
Supervolcanoes
VEI-7 volcanoes
Volcanic fields
Pleistocene calderas
 
First 100 IUGS Geological Heritage Sites